Limestone is an unincorporated community on the western border of Washington County and the eastern border of Greene County in the northeastern part of the U.S. state of Tennessee. Its zip code is 37681. Limestone is part of the Johnson City Metropolitan Statistical Area, which is a component of the Johnson City–Kingsport–Bristol, TN-VA Combined Statistical Area – commonly known as the "Tri-Cities" region.

History
Washington College Academy was founded in Limestone in 1780 by Rev. Samuel Doak, and was the first institution to bear the name of the first American president.  Limestone was the birthplace of David Crockett (1786) to John and Rebecca Crockett.  The Gillespie House, built in 1792 by pioneer settler George Gillespie, still stands in Limestone.  One of the locations used in the TV movie Goodbye, Miss 4th of July (1988) was the Old Stone House in Limestone.

Education
Students in the Washington County portion attend:
West View Elementary School (Grades PK-8) 
Grandview Elementary School (Grades PK-8) 
David Crockett High School (Grades 9-12)

Students in the Greene County portion attend:
Chuckey Elementary School (Grades PK-5; Located in nearby Chuckey)
Chuckey-Doak Middle School (Grades 6–8; Located in Afton)
Chuckey-Doak High School (Grades 9-12; Located in Afton)

Washington College Academy is located in the Washington College area of Limestone.

Postal service
Limestone has its own post office and ZIP code (37681). The post office is located at 359 Opie Arnold Road, Limestone, Tennessee 37681, in the Washington County portion of the community.

Recreation
David Crockett Birthplace State Park is located in the western portion of Limestone. The park provides camping, picnicking and other recreational activities, and includes a replica of Crockett's birth cabin and a small museum.

Notable people
Glenn D. Broyles, member of the Tennessee House of Representatives, 1969-1972 was born in Limestone.
Tilly Walker, outfielder for 1916 World Series champion Boston Red Sox, was raised in Limestone.
Davy Crockett, soldier, folk hero, frontiersman & politician was born in Limestone.

References

Unincorporated communities in Washington County, Tennessee
Unincorporated communities in Greene County, Tennessee
Unincorporated communities in Tennessee
Johnson City metropolitan area, Tennessee